Innocent Mahamadu Yahaya (17 April 1954 – 12 September 2000) was a Ghanaian politician and a member of the Second Parliament of the Fourth Republic representing the Chereponi Constituency in Northern Ghana.

Early life and education 
Yahaya was born at Cheroponi in the Northern Region of Ghana. He attended Academy of Social Science and obtained a Diploma in Political Economy and the Gbewaah Training College and obtained a Teacher's Training Certificate.

Politics 

He was elected into the first parliament of the fourth republic of Ghana on 7 January 1993, after he was pronounced winner at the 1992 Ghanaian parliamentary election held on 29 December 1992.

Yahaya was then re-elected into the second parliament of the fourth republic of Ghana on the ticket of the National Democratic Congress after he emerged winner at the 1996 Ghanaian general elections for the Chereponi constituency in the Northern Region of Ghana. He polled 9,092 votes out of the 17,158 valid votes cast representing 39.60% over his opponents Jakpa Samson Mariba who polled 3,825 votes, Bawa Ali Manshi who polled 2,794 votes and Tabi Anthony Bondo Yaw who polled 1,510 votes. He was defeated in the 2000 Party's Primaries by Mohammed Seidu Abah.

Career 
Aside being a Politician, Yahaya was a Teacher.

Personal life 
Yahaya is a Muslim. He died on 12 September 2000.

References 

Ghanaian MPs 1997–2001
National Democratic Congress (Ghana) politicians
People from Northern Region (Ghana)
20th-century Ghanaian politicians
Ghanaian Muslims
Ghanaian educators
1954 births
2000 deaths
Ghanaian MPs 1993–1997